Avraham Shapira (20 May 1914, Jerusalem – 27 September 2007) was a prominent rabbi in the Religious Zionist world. Shapira had been the head of the Rabbinical court of Jerusalem, and both a member and the head of the Supreme Rabbinic Court. He served as the Ashkenazi Chief Rabbi of Israel from 1983 to 1993. Shapira was the rosh yeshiva of Mercaz haRav in Jerusalem, a position he held since Rabbi Zvi Yehuda Kook died in 1982.

Biography
Avraham Elkanah Shapira was born to a Jerusalemite family; his father was Rabbi Shlomo Zalman Shapira. As a child, he lived in the Jewish Quarter of Jerusalem's Old City and would pray at the Western Wall each morning.

In his youth, he studied at Etz Chaim Yeshiva in Jerusalem, later moving to the Hebron Yeshiva, where he studied under Rabbis Moshe Mordechai Epstein and Yechezkel Sarna. After his marriage, Rabbi Zvi Yehuda Kook invited him to join Mercaz HaRav yeshiva. He corresponded, in his youth, with the Chazon Ish, Rabbi Zvi Pesach Frank, Rabbi Yitzchak Zev Soloveitchik, and Rabbi Isser Zalman Meltzer.

In 1956, he was appointed as a member of the Jerusalem religious court by Chief Rabbi Yitzhak HaLevi Herzog. In 1971, he was appointed Av Beit Din.

Shapira was elected Ashkenazi Chief Rabbi of Israel in 1983, serving alongside Rabbi Mordechai Eliyahu, who was elected Sefardi Chief Rabbi. His wife Penina reportedly spent election day at the Western Wall, praying that her husband not be elected, as the position would put him in the political and secular limelight.

He died on the first day of Succot, 2007. Fifteen days earlier, on the preceding Rosh Hashana, he had been brought to prayers in a wheelchair. Within days, he was hospitalized, and did not recover.

Tens of thousands of people took part in his funeral procession on September 28, 2007. Occurring on the eve of Shabbat, the procession stretched from its starting point at the Mercaz HaRav Yeshiva, through the streets of Jerusalem, past the original location of the yeshiva in the Geula neighbourhood, and terminated at the Mount of Olives Jewish Cemetery, where Rabbi Shapira was interred.

Shapira and his wife Penina had four sons. As per his will, his son Rabbi Yaakov Shapira was appointed Rosh Yeshiva of Mercaz HaRav after him.

Views
During the Oslo Accords, Shapira ruled that handing over territories violates Jewish law. He also called on soldiers to refuse orders to dismantle Jewish communities during the 2005 disengagement from Gaza.

Published works
 Shiurey Maran HaGra Shapira – A summary of the rabbi's lectures, comprising six volumes
 Minchat Avraham – A collection of original halachic essays, comprising three volumes
 Morasha – Original essays on various topics

References

1914 births
2007 deaths
Ashkenazi Jews in Ottoman Palestine
Ashkenazi Jews in Mandatory Palestine
Israeli Ashkenazi Jews
20th-century rabbis in Jerusalem
Chief rabbis of Israel
Religious Zionist rosh yeshivas
Burials at the Jewish cemetery on the Mount of Olives
Chardal